Exclusive may refer to:

Arts and entertainment
 Exclusive (album), by R&B singer Chris Brown
 Exclusive (EP), an EP by U2
 Exclusive, a 1937 American film
 Exclusive, a 1989 play by Jeffrey Archer
 Exclusive (TV series), a 2008 Malaysian drama television series
 "Exclusive", an episode of One Day at a Time (2017 TV series)

Organisations
 Exclusive Books, a bookseller chain in South Africa
 Exclusive Hotels, a hotel chain based in Surrey, England
 Exclusive Records, an American record label from 1944 to 1949

Other uses
 Exclusive relationship, a closed, committed relationship
 Exclusive (news), a news story reported by one organization before others
 Noah Boeken (born 1981), Dutch poker professional, online nickname "Exclusive"
 Exclusive (horse), a British Thoroughbred racehorse
 Exclusive OR, a type of logic gate

See also
 The Exclusives (TV series), a 2012 British reality competition television series
 Exclusive relationship (programming)
 Exclusion (disambiguation)